Don Lee Gevirtz (1928–2001) was a non-career appointee who served concurrent appointments as the Ambassador Extraordinary and Plenipotentiary to Tuvalu, Fiji, Nauru and Tonga from 1995 until 1997.

At the time of his nomination, Gevirtz was the Chairman and Chief Executive Officer of the Foothill Group Incorporated, Los Angeles financial services firm and was a big contributor to Bill Clinton.

Gevirtz is an honors graduate of the University of Southern California. He and his wife Marilyn endowed the Gevirtz Graduate School of Education at UCSB.

References

1928 births
2001 deaths
University of Southern California alumni
American chief executives of financial services companies
Ambassadors of the United States to Tuvalu
Ambassadors of the United States to Fiji
Ambassadors of the United States to Nauru
Ambassadors of the United States to Tonga
20th-century American philanthropists
20th-century American diplomats